Road to the Riches: The Best of the Purple City Mixtape is the first compilation album by Purple City, released on March 22, 2005 through Babygrande Records. The album has the singles "Purple City Byrdgang" (for which a music video was shot) and "It Ain't Easy" (its B-side).

Road to the Riches has been Purple City's most commercially successful album to date, peaking at number 164 on the Billboard 200.

Track listing
"The Road to the Richest" – 1:05
"Piff Iz da Answer" – 3:00
"Winning" – 4:07
"Purple City Byrdgang" – 3:55
"Insight With Panchi" – 0:29
"Me & U" – 3:51
"It Ain't Easy" – 3:35
"Broadway" – 1:55
"Will Not Lose" – 2:49
"Copz Is Coming" – 0:17
"Insight with Panchi II" – 3:49
"Real Niggaz"  –4:23
"A Part of History" – 4:08
"Insight with Panchi III" – 0:23
"Roll It Up, Light It Up" – 4:20
"America Show" – 3:49
"A Star" – 3:03
"The Accident" – 2:07
"Late Night" – 3:38
"Gun Go" – 4:05
"Come 2 Get Ya" – 4:17

Chart history

2005 compilation albums
Babygrande Records compilation albums
Purple City Productions albums
Albums produced by Agallah